The women's 10,000 metres event at the 2013 Summer Universiade was held on 7 July.

Medalists

Results

References 
Results

10000
2013 in women's athletics
2013